Square Eats is an online food ordering and delivery platform founded in Botswana operating in the African region. Square Eats is one of several technology companies in Africa that uses logistics services to offer food delivery from restaurants and stores that previously did not offer delivery on-demand. It currently operates in the African countries of Botswana, Namibia, and South Africa.

History 
It is headquartered in Gaborone, Botswana.

Service 
Square Eats facilitates delivery from various merchant partners to its customers through either a smartphone app, available on iOS and Android platforms, or via their website. The food business allows users to find and place orders with their favourite restaurants which is picked up when ready and delivered to the user's doorstep.

Operations

COVID-19 initiative 
By mid-2020, in the middle of the COVID-19 pandemic where demand for services delivering items surged, Square Eats announced it had "stockpiled thousands of gloves and bottles of hand sanitizer" and was offering them to delivery drivers for free. The company also said it had changed the default drop-off option to contactless delivery. Square Eats became the fastest growing meal delivery service during the course of the pandemic in Botswana.

See also 

 DoorDash
 Rappi
 Talabat
 Mascom
 BTC

References

External links 

 

Food and drink companies of Botswana
Companies of Botswana
Companies of Gaborone
Online food ordering